Iglesia Santa María Reina is a Roman Catholic church in Barrio Canas Urbano, Ponce, Puerto Rico. A unique characteristic of the church is its vaulted roof.

History 
Built in 1957, the building houses a Roman Catholic congregation. The congregation itself was organized in 1952. The church is located at the southeast corner of the intersection of Avenida Muñoz Rivera and Avenida Las Américas, on the grounds of the Pontifical Catholic University of Puerto Rico. A visit to the temple is part of a yearly tour of temples in Ponce organized by the Pontifical Catholic University of Puerto Rico School of Architecture during Lent.

Architecture 
A unique characteristic of the church is its vaulted roof. Its novel architecture received an award by the American Institute of Architects "for passing the test of time." For many years, the building was the largest Catholic temple in Puerto Rico. It is a modern architecture structure with Gothic elements.

Notes

References 

Churches completed in 1957
Churches in Ponce, Puerto Rico
1957 in Puerto Rico
1957 establishments in Puerto Rico
Roman Catholic churches in Ponce, Puerto Rico